The assistant bishops of Sydney are the assistant bishops in the Anglican Diocese of Sydney, Australia. They each assist the Archbishop of Sydney by maintaining delegated episcopal oversight over a particular geographical area.

Prior to the formation of the current "regions" arrangement in around 1967, the archbishop was assisted by a number of suffragan bishops with no particular geographical area (nor expectation to succeed to the diocesan see). The first regional see created was that of Parramatta, whose first assistant bishop was consecrated in 1967. In 1969, the first Bishop of Wollongong was consecrated. The Southern (aka South Sydney) and North regions followed in 1972 and 1975 respectively. In 1993, the fifth regional see, Georges River, was created.

Effective from 1 July 2021, the regions were changed to plan for Sydney's future growth in the southwestern areas. As part of this change:
 five parishes in the Hills District (Castle Hill, Glenhaven, Dural, Cherrybrook and West Pennant Hills) were moved from the Western Region to Northern Region
 seven parishes in the Canterbury-Bankstown and St George areas (Sans Souci, Kogarah, Brighton-Rockdale, Bayside, Marrickville, Earlwood and Canterbury) were moved from the Georges River Region to Southern Region
 13 parishes in the Macarthur area (Camden, Campbelltown, Cobbity, Denham Court, Eagle Vale, Ingleburn, Menangle, Minto, Narellan, Oran Park, Rosemeadow, South Creek and The Oaks) were moved from the Wollongong Region to Georges River Region.

To reflect the new regional boundaries and the fact that the Georges River Region had moved away from that area, the Georges River Region was renamed to the "South Western Region".

Suffragan bishops of Sydney

Bishops of the Western Region
The Western Region of the diocese, formed in 1967, is based in Parramatta – hence previous bishops have been more commonly known as the Bishop of Parramatta (until around 1993). The Bishop's seat is St John's Cathedral, Parramatta. The Region covers parishes west of Strathfield out to the Blue Mountains and Lithgow. The bishop is often known as the "Bishop of Western Sydney".

Bishops of Wollongong
The Wollongong Region, created around 1969, covers the Sutherland Shire, Wollongong, Kiama, Shoalhaven and the Southern Highlands. Until 2021 it also covered the Camden and Campbelltown areas. St Michael's Cathedral, Wollongong lies within the region.

Bishops of the Southern Region
The Southern Region extends from the edge of the Pacific Ocean in the east to Strathfield and Concord in the west and from the southern shore of Port Jackson across to the northern and western parts of Botany Bay. The bishop is often referred to as the Bishop of South Sydney.

Bishops of the Northern Region
The Northern Region covers from Port Jackson to the Hawkesbury River and from the Hills District to Palm Beach. The bishop is also sometimes called Bishop of North Sydney.

Bishops of the South Western Region (formerly the Georges River Region)
The South Western Region covers the south-western areas of Sydney stretching from Campsie to Campbelltown and including Liverpool, Bankstown and Fairfield. Prior to changes in 2021 the areas in the eastern Canterbury-Bankstown and Bayside areas (which are now part of the Southern Region) were also included. When created in 1993, the bishop was referred to as the "Bishop of Liverpool" (although that title was less convenient due to the existence of an Anglican Bishop of Liverpool in England), and from 2013 until 2021 was then known as the "Bishop of Georges River".

Bishops for International Relations
The Bishop for International Relations represents the Archbishop at consecrations and conferences, and makes pastoral visits across the globe to represent the Diocese.

References

Sources

Lists of Anglican bishops and archbishops
Lists of Australian people by occupation
New South Wales-related lists
 
Assistant bishops in the Diocese of Sydney
Australia religion-related lists